Dame Maureen Diane Lipman  (born 10 May 1946) is an English actress, writer and comedian. She trained at the London Academy of Music and Dramatic Art and her stage work has included appearances with the National Theatre and the Royal Shakespeare Company. She was made a dame in the 2020 Queen's Birthday Honours for services to charity, entertainment and the arts.

Early life and education
Lipman was born on 10 May 1946 in Hull, East Riding of Yorkshire, England, the daughter of Maurice Julius Lipman and Zelma Pearlman. Her father was a tailor; he used to have a shop between the Ferens Art Gallery and Monument Bridge. Lipman grew up Jewish and found post-war Hull a welcoming place for the Jewish community. She lived in Northfield Road, Hull and attended Wheeler Primary School.

Lipman then attended Newland School for Girls in Hull, and became interested in performing as a youth; she performed in school shows, attended an early Beatles concert, and watched Elizabeth Taylor's Butterfield 8 fifteen times. Her first performances at home included impersonations of Alma Cogan; "a nice Jewish girl, she was big in our house", and she was encouraged into an acting career by her mother, who used to take her to the pantomime and push her onto the stage. 

Lipman trained at the London Academy of Music and Dramatic Art.

Career

Theatre
Lipman worked extensively in the theatre following her début in a stage production of The Knack at the Palace Theatre, Watford. In order to get the post, she pretended that a documentary producer wanted to follow her finding her first job – this was a lie but it seemed to work.

Lipman was a member of Laurence Olivier's National Theatre Company at the Old Vic from 1971 to 1973 and of the Royal Shakespeare Company for its 1973 Stratford season. 

Lipman has continued to work in the theatre for over thirty years, playing, among other roles, Aunt Eller in the National Theatre's Oklahoma!.

From November 2005 to April 2006 she played Florence Foster Jenkins in the Olivier Award-nominated show Glorious! at the Duchess Theatre in London's West End.

From October 2010 to February 2011, Lipman starred in a production of J.B. Priestley's When We Are Married at the Garrick Theatre. In 2012 she directed and appeared in a production of Barefoot in the Park on tour and starred in Old Money at the Hampstead Theatre. In 2013, she starred in Daytona at The Park Theatre followed by a tour, and in 2014 a season at the Theatre Royal Haymarket. In 2015, she starred with James Dreyfus in Mary Chase's play Harvey at Birmingham Rep, on tour and at the Theatre Royal Haymarket. In 2016, she starred in My Mother Said I Never Should at the St. James Theatre. In 2017, she starred with Felicity Kendal in a revival of Lettice and Lovage at the Menier Chocolate Factory. In 2018, she starred with Martin Shaw in The Best Man at the Playhouse Theatre, as well as returning to the Edinburgh Festival Fringe for the first time in fifty years with a one-woman show of jokes and storytelling called Up For It.

Television
After early appearances in the sitcoms The Lovers, and Doctor at Large, and a role in The Evacuees (1975), Lipman first gained prominence on television in the situation comedy Agony (1979-1981), in which she played an agony aunt with a troubled private life. In her role as Stella Craven in Smiley's People (1982), Lipman appeared with Alec Guinness.

She performed the Joyce Grenfell monologue The Committee for the first time on The Green Tie on the Little Yellow Dog, which was recorded 1982, and broadcast by Channel 4 in 1983.  

She played the lead role in the television series All at No 20 (1986–87) and took on a range of diverse characters when starring in the series of comedy plays About Face (1989–91). She is known for playing Joyce Grenfell in the biographical show Re: Joyce!, which she co-wrote with James Roose-Evans.

She appeared as snooty landlady Lillian Spencer in Coronation Street for six episodes in 2002. The character was employed by Fred Elliott  (John Savident) to run The Rovers Return Inn. She re-joined the cast of Coronation  Street in August 2018, this time playing Evelyn Plummer, the long-lost grandmother of Tyrone Dobbs (Alan Halsall).

Lipman played Maggie Wych in the children's television show The Fugitives broadcast in 2006. She has narrated two television series on the subject of design, one for UKTV about Art Deco and one about 20th-century design for ITV/Sky Travel. In 2003 she appeared in Jonathan Creek in the episode "The Tailor's Dummy".

She performed as a villain, The Wire, in the 2006 series of Doctor Who in the episode entitled "The Idiot's Lantern". 

She has also appeared on Just a Minute, The News Quiz, That Reminds Me, This Week and Have I Got News for You. In 2007, Lipman appeared as a celebrity contestant on Comic Relief Does The Apprentice to raise money for Comic Relief. The show saw her helping to run a funfair. Later in 2007, she made a guest appearance in Casualty; this was followed by an appearance in a December 2011 episode of the Casualty spin-off Holby City, playing a different character.

In May 2008, she appeared in the BBC documentary series Comedy Map of Britain. On Sunday 11 January 2009, BBC Four was devoted to a "Maureen Lipman Night". On 5 February 2009, she appeared in the third series of teen drama Skins, in the episode entitled "Thomas" as Pandora Moon's Aunt Elizabeth.

She appeared twice on The Paul O'Grady Show during its run, once alongside Julie Walters to promote her most-recent book Past-It Notes, the other to speak about her appearance as Madame Armfeldt in the Sondheim musical A Little Night Music, showing at the Menier Chocolate Factory. In both of these appearances, she also spoke briefly about her role as Irene Spencer in the ITV3 comedy Ladies of Letters, in which she leads alongside Anne Reid. The show's first series started in 2009, and returned for a second series in 2010.

Film
Lipman made an early film appearance in Up the Junction (1968). She played the title character's mother in Roman Polanski's film The Pianist (2002). 

In the 1999 film Solomon & Gaenor, the character she played spoke Yiddish throughout.

Advertising

In 1987, she was cast as the character "Beatrice Bellman" ("Beatie/BT"), a Jewish grandmother in a series of television commercials for British Telecom, a role which became sufficiently well known to launch a book You Got An Ology in 1989, and which was still referred to 25 years later by politicians.

Books, newspapers and magazines
After her husband died in May 2004 she completed his autobiography By Jack Rosenthal, and played herself in her daughter's four-part adaptation of the book, Jack Rosenthal's Last Act on BBC Radio Four in July 2006. Her anthology, The Gibbon's In Decline But The Horse Is Stable, is a book of animal poems which is illustrated by established cartoonists, including Posy Simmonds and Gerald Scarfe, to raise money for Myeloma UK, to combat the cancer to which she lost her husband.

She also wrote a monthly column for Good Housekeeping magazine for over ten years, which formed the basis for several autobiographical books, including How Was It For You?, Something To Fall Back On, Thank You For Having Me, You Can Read Me Like A Book and Lip Reading. Lipman has also contributed a weekly column in The Guardian in the newspaper's G2 section.

She writes for The Oldie and is on the editorial advisory board of Jewish Renaissance magazine.

Personal and family life
Lipman is Jewish. She lives in Muswell Hill, north London and has two children, writers Amy and Adam Rosenthal.

She was married to dramatist Jack Rosenthal from 1974 until his death in 2004, and has had a number of roles in his works. 

Retired computer expert Guido Castro, an Egyptian Jew, was her partner from 2008 until his death in January 2021.

Political views

Burma
Lipman supports the work of the Burma Campaign UK, Europe's largest NGO regarding Myanmar (Burma). Lipman supports the process of democratisation in the country. Lipman also supports the work of Prospect Burma, a non-political charity that offers Burmese students the opportunity to study at university overseas. Lipman spoke on behalf of Prospect Burma in the BBC Radio 4 Appeal,  broadcast in September 2009.

Israel and the Palestinians

Lipman supported Israel during the 2006 Israel–Hezbollah conflict. On 13 July 2006, in a debate on the BBC's This Week, she argued that "human life is not cheap to the Israelis, and human life on the other side is quite cheap actually, because they strap bombs to people and send them to blow themselves up." These comments were condemned by columnist Yasmin Alibhai-Brown who said "Brutally straight, she sees no equivalence between the lives of the two tribes". Lipman responded to Alibhai-Brown's accusation of racism by arguing that the columnist had deliberately misrepresented Lipman's comments as generalisations about Muslims rather than specific comments about terrorists.

In The Jewish Chronicle, Lipman argued that media reporting of the conflict was "heavily distorted":

In May 2015, Lipman joined pro-Israel groups including the Zionist Federation in a protest outside the London premiere of a Palestinian play, The Siege, at Battersea Arts Centre.

In an interview with The Guardian on 18 August 2020, Lipman inaccurately asserted that Hezbollah had claimed responsibility for the 2020 Beirut explosion, stating: "I’m very grateful that Hezbollah said they did it". She intimated that she would not be prepared to work alongside some pro-Palestinian actors, citing Maxine Peake and Miriam Margolyes as examples, the latter of whom she worked with repeatedly in the 1980s and 1990s in the series of adverts she did with BT.

Antisemitism
In a January 2015 interview on LBC Radio, Lipman said she was considering emigrating to the United States or Israel in response to perceived increased antisemitism in the UK.

The Labour Party
Lipman previously supported  the Labour Party but declared in October 2014 that she  could no longer do so due to the then-leader Ed Miliband's support for a parliamentary motion in favour of recognising the State of Palestine. 

In April 2018, Lipman criticised Labour Party leader Jeremy Corbyn for antisemitism in the Labour Party and the party's reputed failure to address the issue. Lipman attended a protest outside the Labour Party head office and said she attended the protest “as a disenfranchised socialist”. She identified with a placard reading “Corbyn made me a Tory”. In a 2020 interview, she described herself as a "Labour luvvie" under the tenure of Tony Blair, as opposed to a "party member". However, she also said she'd have to be "stark raving mad to support Boris Johnson".

Filmography

Film

Television

Publications
 How Was It For You? Home thoughts from a broad, Little Brown, 1986. 
 Something to Fall Back On...and other pretty colourful material, Robson Books, 1987. 
 (with Richard Philips)You Got An Ology?, Robson Books, 1989. 
 Thank You For Having Me, Robson Books, 1990. 
 When's It Coming Out, Robson Books, 1992. 
 You Can Read Me Like A Book, Robson Books, 1995. 
Lip Reading, Robson Books, 1999. 
 The Gibbon's in Decline But the Horse is Stable..., Robson Books, 2006. 
 Past-it Notes, Gardners Books, 2008. 
 I Must Collect Myself: Choice Cuts From a Long Shelf-Life, Simon & Schuster, 2010. 
 It's a Jungle Out There: A Lipman-Agerie, Biteback Publishing, 2016.

Awards and nominations
She was awarded the Laurence Olivier Award for Best Comedy Performance in 1985 (1984 season) for See How They Run.
She was awarded an honorary doctorate from the University of Hull in 1994.
Her show, Live and Kidding, performed at the Duchess Theatre, was nominated for the Olivier Award for Best Entertainment.
In 2003, for The Pianist (2002), she was nominated for Best Supporting Actress at the Polish Film Awards.
In October 2019, she won the award for "Best Newcomer" at The Inside Soap Awards 2019 for her portrayal of Evelyn Plummer in Coronation Street.

Honours

Lipman was appointed Commander of the Order of the British Empire (CBE) in the 1999 New Year Honours and Dame Commander of the Order of the British Empire (DBE) in the 2020 Birthday Honours for services to charity, entertainment and the arts. Accompanied by her son, Adam Rosenthal, she received her award from Charles, Prince of Wales at Windsor Castle on 28 October 2021.

Legacy
Her papers, and those of her husband Jack Rosenthal, are held at the University of Sheffield.

References

External links

Green, Linda (22 December 2006). A short bio of Maureen Lipman. Retrieved 29 October 2021.

Maureen Lipman's Guardian column
Maureen Lipman in webTV interview talking about By Jack Rosenthal and working on Doctor Who, July 2006, BBC Norfolk. Retrieved 29 October 2021.
The Oldie magazine

1946 births
Living people
20th-century British non-fiction writers
20th-century English women writers
20th-century English writers
21st-century British non-fiction writers
21st-century English women writers
Actresses awarded damehoods
Actresses from Kingston upon Hull
Actresses from Yorkshire
Alumni of the London Academy of Music and Dramatic Art
British comedy actresses
British Zionists
Comedians from Yorkshire
Dames Commander of the Order of the British Empire
English film actresses
English Jewish writers
English Jews
English radio actresses
English soap opera actresses
English stage actresses
English television actresses
English women comedians
The Guardian journalists
Jewish English actresses
Jewish English comedians
Jewish female comedians
Jewish women writers
Labour Party (UK) people
Laurence Olivier Award winners
People associated with the University of Sheffield
People from Muswell Hill
Royal Shakespeare Company members